Kenya Airways Ltd., more commonly known as Kenya Airways, is the flag carrier airline of Kenya. The company was founded in 1977, after the dissolution of East African Airways. Its head office is located in Embakasi, Nairobi, with its hub at Jomo Kenyatta International Airport.

The airline was owned by the Government of Kenya until , and it was privatised in 1996, becoming the first African flag carrier to successfully do so. Kenya Airways is currently a public-private partnership. The largest shareholder is the Government of Kenya (48.9%), with 38.1% being owned by KQ Lenders Company 2017 Ltd (in turn owned by a consortium of banks), followed by KLM, which has a 7.8% stake in the company. The rest of the shares are held by private owners; shares are traded on the Nairobi Stock Exchange, the Dar es Salaam Stock Exchange, and the Uganda Securities Exchange.

History

Early years
On , two Boeing 707-321s leased from British Midland Airways inaugurated operations, serving the Nairobi–Frankfurt–London route. On internal and regional flights, the carrier deployed aircraft formerly operated by the EAA consortium, such as one Douglas DC-9-52 and three Fokker F-27-200s. In late 1977, three Boeing 707s were acquired from Northwest Orient. The following year, the company formed a charter subsidiary named Kenya Flamingo Airlines, which leased aircraft from the parent airline in order to operate international passenger and cargo services. Aer Lingus provided the company with technical and management support in the early years.

1980s–1990s: Expansion and privatisation

In , the airline had 2 100 employees and a fleet of three Boeing 707-320Bs, one Boeing 720B, one DC-9-30 and three Fokker F-27-200s. At this time, Addis Ababa, Athens, Bombay, Cairo, Copenhagen, Frankfurt, Jeddah, Kampala, Karachi, Khartoum, London, Lusaka, Mauritius, Mogadishu, Rome, Salisbury, Seychelles and Zurich were among the airline's international destinations, whereas domestic routes radiated from Nairobi to Kisumu, Malindi, Mombasa and Mumias. A Nairobi–Bombay nonstop route was launched in 1982 using Boeing 707-320Bs. A year later, the company commenced serving Tanzania. Flights to Burundi, Malawi and Rwanda were launched in 1984. That year, the airline ordered two Airbus A310-300s. Kenya Airways was the first African carrier to acquire the type, and they were the first wide-bodies ordered by the company. They flew on the Kenya–Europe corridor, and permitted Kenya Airways to return the A310-200 to the lessor. In early 1988, the carrier ordered two Fokker 50s; for domestic routes, the airline received the first of these aircraft at the end of the year. By late 1991, two Boeing 737-200s had been leased from Guinness Peat Aviation.

In 1986, Sessional Paper Number 1 was published by the Government of Kenya, outlining the country's need for economic development and growth. The document stressed the government opinion that the airline would be better off privately owned, thus resulting in the first privatisation attempt. The government named Philip Ndegwa as chairman of the board in 1991, with specific orders to make the airline a privately owned company. In 1992, the Public Enterprise Reform paper was published, giving Kenya Airways priority among national companies in Kenya to be privatised. Ndegwa was succeeded by Isaac Omolo Okero. In , Brian Davies, was appointed as the new managing director of the company. Davies had been previously hired to carry out a study of viability on privatisation, working for British Airways' Speedwing consulting arm. Swissair was the first company to provide Kenya Airways with privatisation advice. In the fiscal year 1993 to 1994, the airline produced its first profit since the start of commercialisation. In 1994, the International Finance Corporation was appointed to provide assistance in the privatisation process, which effectively began in 1995. A large aviation industry partner was sought to acquire 40% of the shares, with another 40% reserved for private investors and the government keeping the remaining stake. The government would absorb almost  million in debts and would convert another  million it provided in loans into equity; after reorganisation, the company would have a debt of approximately  million. British Airways, KLM, Lufthansa and South African Airways were among the airlines expressing interest in taking a stake in Kenya Airways.

KLM was awarded the privatisation of the company, which restructured its debts and made a master corporation agreement with KLM, which bought 26% of the shares, becoming the largest single shareholder since then. The Government of Kenya kept a 23% stake in the company, and offered the remaining 51% to the public; however, non-Kenyan shareholders could hold a maximum 49% share of the airline. Despite 40% of the shares being kept by foreign investors following privatisation (including KLM 26% stake), top management positions were held by Kenyans. Following the takeover, the government of Kenya capitalised  million, while the airline was awarded a  million loan from the International Finance Corporation to modernise its fleet.

2000s–2010s
In , the airline experienced its first fatal accident when an Airbus A310 that had been bought new in 1986 crashed off Ivory Coast, shortly after taking off from Abidjan. By  the same year, the fleet consisted of four Airbus A310-300s, two Boeing 737-200 Advanced and four Boeing 737-300s. At this time the company had a staff of 2,780, including 400 engineers, 146 flight crew and 365 cabin crew. From its main hub at Jomo Kenyatta International Airport, scheduled services were operated to Abidjan, Addis Ababa, Amsterdam, Bujumbura, Cairo, Copenhagen, Dar es Salaam, Douala, Dubai, Eldoret, Entebbe/Kampala, Harare, Johannesburg, Karachi, Khartoum, Kigali, Kinshasa, Lagos, Lilongwe, Lokichoggio, London, Lusaka, Mahe Island, Malindi, Mombasa, Mumbai, and Zanzibar. The original Boeing 787 order was amended  months later to include  more aircraft of the type. The first Embraer 190 joined the fleet in December 2010.

In  the company announced the issuance of rights worth KSh.20 billion/=, aimed at increasing capital to support expansion plans. Following the allocation of shares, KLM increased their stake in the company from 26% to 26.73%, while the Kenyan government boosted their participation into the company from 23% to 29.8%, becoming the largest shareholder. In , the airline launched a plan named Project Mawingu (the Swahili word meaning Clouds) to add 24 destinations by 2021, including the start of services to Australia and North and South America, and expanding its presence in Asia as well. In , the airline stated that it will add six new destinations every year, following the delivery of Boeing 777s and 787s the carrier has on order.

Operational results for fiscal years 2015 and 2016 showed substantial losses. The rapid expansion of the fleet and routes (dubbed "Project Mawingu") was cited as the primary cause of the downturn. Fuel-price hedging and the 1996 agreement with KLM, considered intrusive in the running of the flag carrier, took secondary blame. Corrective measures were taken to improve the financial and operational position of the airline and avert insolvency. 
The route partnership with KLM was deemed profitable thus, kept. However, the parties agreed to amend some features of the deal that had a negative effect on KQ -IATA code for Kenya Airways. Two Boeing B737-700 were sold and five newer, leased airliners were sub-leased to improve cash flow. Efforts to financially re-position the carrier were successful at the end of 2017. In a complex deal, stakeholders agreed to convert close to half a billion US dollars in loans to equity, changing the ownership structure. The government of Kenya, the biggest lender, saw its holdings rise from 29.8% to 48.9% while that of KLM was diluted from 26.7% down to 7.8%. A consortium of local banks, through a special-purpose vehicle called: "KQ Lenders Company 2017 Ltd.", ended up with 38.1%. The latter entity is obligated with a loan from the above local banks in the amount of US$225 million; this amount, in turn, is guaranteed by the government. The airline's employees, through a shareholding scheme, and others own the remaining 5.2%. The Government of Kenya issued a guarantee for a further US$525 million debt owed to Import-Export Bank of the United States, financier of the newer Boeing planes of its fleet. 
In a bid to recover their exposure, syndicated leaseholders and banks unsuccessfully fought these measures to restructure the carrier's ownership.

An outline of a plan to restore profitability was disclosed in a March 2018 interview given by the CEO and the chairman of the company. The turnaround operation will include route expansion, pursuing the high-end segment of the market and, on partnerships and joint ventures with other airlines. The carrier plans to add up to twenty new destinations in Africa, Europe and Asia in the next five years. Five sub-leased aircraft are to re-join the fleet by the end of 2019 to facilitate this move. Preparations are underway to roll out an economy-plus class to target the business and high-end leisure travelers. Direct flights to luxury-tourism destinations in the Indian Ocean are also planned. Talks are underway with South African Airways regarding route-sharing and aircraft-maintenance collaboration; this is the other focus of the turnaround scheme. In December 2018 Kenya Airways revealed plans to start flights between Nairobi and Windhoek, Namibia.

Corporate affairs

Subsidiaries and associates
Low-cost carrier Jambojet, created in 2013, and African Cargo Handling Limited are both wholly owned subsidiaries of Kenya Airways.

Partly owned companies include Kenya Airfreight Handling Limited, dedicated to the cargo handling of perishable goods (51%-owned) and Tanzanian carrier Precision Air (41.23%-owned).

Business trends
The key trends for the Kenya Airways group over recent years are shown below (to 31 March until 2017; periods ending 31 December thereafter):

Key people
, Michael Joseph is the airline chairman. Joseph is the former CEO of Safaricom, the leading telecom operator in Kenya.

, Sebastian Mikosz became Kenya Airways Group's managing director and chief executive officer (CEO). Mikosz was formerly CEO of LOT Polish Airlines, and took office on 1 June 2017.

, Allan Kilavuka was appointed as Kenya Airways Group's Acting Chief Executive Officer. He was subsequently confirmed in the substantive role.

Destinations

Kenya Airways serves 53 destinations in 41 countries, .

Alliances
KLM sponsored Kenya Airways' SkyTeam candidacy process in mid-2005. The alliance provides Kenya Airways' passengers with access to the member airlines' worldwide network and passenger facilities.

Codeshare agreements
Kenya Airways has codeshare agreements with the following airlines:

 Aeroflot
 Air Austral
 Air Burkina
 Air France
 Air Mauritius
 British Airways
 China Eastern Airlines
 China Southern Airlines
 Delta Air Lines
 EgyptAir
 Etihad Airways
 Garuda Indonesia
 Hong Kong Airlines
 ITA Airways
 KLM
 Korean Air
 LAM Mozambique Airlines
 Precision Air
 Royal Air Maroc
 Saudia
 South African Airways
 TAAG Angola Airlines
 Vietnam Airlines

Fleet

Current fleet

, the Kenya Airways fleet consists of the following aircraft:

Recent developments and future plans
The company took delivery of its first Boeing 777-300ER in October 2013.

Kenya Airways had nine Boeing 787 Dreamliners on order as of April 2011, although the company considered cancelling the order after systematic delays with the delivery dates. The handover of the first Boeing 787 took place on 4 April 2014. Two days later, Nairobi–Paris became the first route to be served by the Boeing 787.

Kenya Airways phased out its Boeing 777s in May 2015 after the airline made losses and incurred debts in the previous financial year. The Boeing 777-300ER fleet was leased to Turkish Airlines in May 2016.

Historical fleet

The company has previously operated the following aircraft:

 Airbus A310-200
 Airbus A310-300
 ATR 42-300
 Boeing 707-320
 Boeing 707-320B
 Boeing 707-320C
 Boeing 720B
 Boeing 737-200
 Boeing 737-200C
 Boeing 737-300
 Boeing 737-700
 Boeing 747-100
 Boeing 747-200B
 Boeing 757
 Boeing 767-300
 Boeing 767-300ER
 Boeing 777-200ER
 Boeing 777-300ER
 Douglas DC-8-70
 Embraer 170
 Fokker F27-200
 Fokker 50
 McDonnell Douglas DC-9-30
 McDonnell Douglas DC-10-30

Livery
In 2005, Kenya Airways changed its livery. The four stripes running all through the length of the fuselage were replaced by the company slogan Pride of Africa, whereas the KA tail logo was replaced by a styled K encircled with a Q to evoke the airline's IATA airline code.

Services

Frequent flyer programmes
Former Kenya Airways' frequent flyer programme Msafiri was merged with KLM's Flying Dutchman in 1997, which was in turn merged with that of Air France and rebranded as Flying Blue in 2005, following the fusion of both companies. Gold Elite and Platinum Elite members of the Flying Blue programme are offered the JV Lounge. This service is provided to Kenya Airways passengers, and to passengers flying with its partner airlines as well. Simba Lounge is a service provided to Kenya Airways Business passengers only. Both lounges are located at Jomo Kenyatta International Airport.

In-flight entertainment
Different in-flight entertainment is available depending upon the aircraft and the class travelled. The airline's in-flight magazine is called Msafiri, and is distributed among the passengers in all aircraft, irrespective of the class.

 Boeing 787-8
Premier World entertainment is AVOD; NVOD is offered in Economy class.
 Boeing 737-700/800
Overhead screens in both classes, plus eight channels of audio offered.
 Embraer 190
Individual in-seat touchscreens.

Accidents and incidents

Kenya Airways has had two fatal accidents and two hull-loss accidents.
 11 July 1989: A Boeing 707-320B, registration 5Y-BBK, overran the runway at Bole International Airport following a brake failure. The aircraft had departed from the same airport, and the non-retraction of the landing gear prompted the crew to return.
 30 January 2000: Flight 431 was a scheduled Abidjan–Lagos–Nairobi service, operated with an Airbus A310-304, registration 5Y-BEN, that plunged into the Atlantic Ocean and broke up, about a minute after taking off from Abidjan's Félix Houphouët-Boigny International Airport. There were 179 people aboard, including a crew of ten; most of the occupants were Nigerians. 169 people were killed.
The flight originated in Abidjan, with a stopover in Douala to pick up passengers. All 114 people on board (105 passengers and 9 crew) were killed.

See also

 Air France–KLM
 Airlines of Africa
 Emily Orwaru, aeronautical engineer
 Irene Koki Mutungi, first female Kenya Airways captain
 Transport in Kenya
 Wanjiku Mugane, member of the board of Kenya Airways

Notes

References

Bibliography

External links

 
 
 
 

 
Airlines of Kenya
Companies listed on the Dar es Salaam Stock Exchange
Companies listed on the Nairobi Securities Exchange
Companies listed on the Uganda Securities Exchange
Kenyan brands
Airlines established in 1977
SkyTeam
Kenyan companies established in 1977